James Monroe High School may refer to:
James Monroe High School (California), a high school located in Southern California acting as part of the Los Angeles Unified School District
James Monroe High School (New York City), a defunct high school in The Bronx
James Monroe High School (Rochester, New York) in Rochester, New York, part of the Rochester City School District
James Monroe High School (Virginia) in Fredericksburg, Virginia
James Monroe High School (West Virginia) in Lindside, West Virginia, the only public high school serving Monroe County, West Virginia